The 1PW Openweight Championship was a professional wrestling championship in the One Pro Wrestling (1PW) promotion.

Title history

References

External links
  1PW Openweight Championship

One Pro Wrestling championships
Openweight wrestling championships